Hopton Wood stone (sometimes Hopton-Wood stone or Hoptonwood stone) is a type of limestone quarried west of Middleton-by-Wirksworth, Derbyshire, England. Described as "very fine, almost like marble" and as "England’s premier 
decorative stone", it is particularly suited to carving, making it popular for tombstones (including many thousands for the Commonwealth War Graves Commission), sculpture and building.

Buildings and structures made using Hopton Wood stone include the Houses of Parliament, Westminster Abbey, the Albert Memorial, Lichfield Cathedral, Calke Abbey, Chatsworth House and Oscar Wilde's tomb.

In 1947 the Hopton-Wood Stone Firms Ltd commissioned a book about Hopton Wood stone, published by Fanfare press.

References

External links 
 Hopton Wood Stone

Geology of Derbyshire
Limestone